So You Want to Learn to Dance is a 1953 American black and white short comedy film co-produced, written and directed by Richard Bare. It stars George O'Hanlon as Joe McDoakes.

Synopsis
Joe McDoakes is invited by his boss to a swanky dance. Joe admits he can't dance and the boss gives him a lesson in the office. At the dance, Joe is a social failure and makes many mistakes while dancing with his boss' wife. Joe goes to a dancing school and becomes a big success.

Cast
 George O'Hanlon as Joe McDoakes
 Steve Carruthers, James Gonzalez, Jack Mower, Suzanne Ridgway, Cosmo Sardo and Bert L. Stevens as Dance Attendees
 Jesslyn Fax as Dance Instructress
 Creighton Hale as Barber
 Emory Parnell as George Blivens - Joe's Boss

In popular culture
A segment of the short, in particular including O'Hanlon and Ridgway, is featured in the 1990 Tiny Toon Adventures episode "Animaniacs!" (not to be confused with the similarly titled animated series that ran from 1993–98).

References

External links
 

American comedy short films
1953 comedy films
1953 films
American black-and-white films
Films directed by Richard L. Bare
Films produced by Gordon Hollingshead
Films scored by William Lava
Warner Bros. short films
1950s American films